Mina Airport  is a public use airport located southeast of Mina, in Mineral County, Nevada, United States. It is owned by U.S. Bureau of Land Management (BLM).

Facilities and aircraft 
Mina Airport covers an area of 29 acres (12 ha) at an elevation of 4,552 feet (1,387 m) above mean sea level. It has one runway designated 13/31 with a dirt surface measuring 4,600 by 165 feet (1,402 x 50 m).

This runway was originally graded for use as an auxiliary field of the Tonopah Army Air Field to the southeast.

For the 12-month period ending August 31, 2012, the airport had 175 general aviation aircraft operations, an average of 14 per month. At that time there were three aircraft based at this airport: 67% single-engine and 33% ultralight.

See also 
 List of airports in Nevada

References

External links 
 Mina Airport (3QØ) diagram from Nevada DOT
 Aerial image as of September 1999 from USGS The National Map
 

Airports in Nevada
Transportation in Mineral County, Nevada
Buildings and structures in Mineral County, Nevada
Bureau of Land Management